The 1988 New York City Marathon was the 19th running of the annual marathon race in New York City, United States, which took place on Sunday, November 6. The men's elite race was won by Great Britain's Steve Jones in a time of 2:08:20 hours while the women's race was won by Norway's Grete Waitz in 2:28:07.

A total of 22,405 runners finished the race, 18,431 men and 3974 women.

Results

Men

Women

References

Results
Results. Association of Road Racing Statisticians. Retrieved 2020-05-24.

External links
New York Road Runners website

1988
New York City
Marathon
New York City Marathon